Brawn GP was a Formula One constructor which competed in the 2009 Formula One World Championship, with drivers Jenson Button and Rubens Barrichello.  The team was formed in 2009 by a management buyout led by Ross Brawn of the Honda Racing F1 Team, after Honda announced their withdrawal from the sport in December 2008 due to the global financial crisis.

The team started development of their car in early 2008, when still owned by Honda. For the 2009 season, Honda provided a $100 million budget, while Mercedes provided engines under a customer relationship.

On its racing debut, the season-opening 2009 Australian Grand Prix, the team took pole position and 2nd place in qualifying and went on to finish first and second in the race. Button won six of the first seven races of the season, and on 18 October at the Brazilian Grand Prix he secured the 2009 Drivers' Championship, while the team won the Constructors' Championship. Barrichello won twice and finished third in the Drivers' Championship. The team won eight of the season's seventeen races, and by taking both titles in its only year of competition became the first to achieve a 100% championship success rate.

On 16 November 2009 it was confirmed that the team's engine supplier, Mercedes-Benz, in partnership with Aabar Investments had purchased a 75.1% stake in Brawn GP, which was renamed Mercedes GP for the 2010 season.

History

Origins
Brawn GP had its origins in the Tyrrell Racing Organisation, a motorsport team founded by Ken Tyrrell in 1958 which entered cars in various single-seater championships. After entering Formula One in 1968, the Tyrrell team won the Constructors' Championship and three Drivers' Championships during the 1970s with Jackie Stewart. The team kept racing in F1 until 1998, when declining results led to Tyrrell selling the team to British American Tobacco. While BAT bought the Formula One entry, they set up the British American Racing team in a new factory in Brackley. BAR competed for six years, with a high point of finishing second in the championship in 2004. Increasing restrictions on tobacco advertising resulted in Honda, BAR's engine partner, acquiring full control of the team at the end of 2005, and the team was renamed as Honda Racing F1.

Brawn GP was formed on 6 March 2009 when it was confirmed that Ross Brawn, the former technical director for the Honda Racing F1, Ferrari and Benetton teams, had bought the team from Honda for £1 in the wake of the Japanese marque's withdrawal from the sport in December 2008. On 17 March 2009 the FIA officially agreed to the name change from Honda Racing F1 Team to Brawn GP. Although the team can be seen as a continuation of the Honda team, the FIA considered Brawn GP to be an entirely new entry, but Keith Hayes, Vice-President of FIA, agreed to waive the standard entry fee in recognition of the team's circumstances.

When choosing a name for the team, a revival of the Tyrrell name was considered, as was "Pure Racing". The name "Pure Racing" was blocked by engine supplier Mercedes, as the constructor name "Pure Racing-Mercedes" could have indicated that it was the works team of Mercedes, which in fact was McLaren at the time.

With the loss of Honda's engines, Brawn stated that several manufacturers offered to supply the team, but it was the Mercedes-Benz engines that best fitted the car. Jenson Button and Rubens Barrichello comprised the driver line-up. It was also rumoured that the team would enter the 2009 season with backing from Bruno Senna, who would bring his personal sponsors to the team.

Although Honda were thought to be the first team to run a KERS in 2008, Brawn stated in an interview that owing to the circumstances of the change in ownership the team had not had the time to consider the system. On 20 March it was confirmed that Brawn GP would be allocated the final pitlane slot, with Force India moving up one slot. Bernie Ecclestone suggested that this was due to the takeover involving a name change, saying that "If [...] it was called Honda. Whatever was due to Honda, they [Brawn GP] would have got." For this reason, Brawn GP were initially assigned numbers 20 and 21 after Force India were assigned Honda's old numbers of 18 and 19. However, this was changed at the request of Force India because their promotional material had already been printed with numbers 20 and 21. Brawn had no objection and were reassigned numbers 22 and 23, with 18 and 19 not assigned to anyone.

2009 race season

In qualifying at Australia Jenson Button took pole, with teammate Rubens Barrichello coming second, followed by Red Bull's Sebastian Vettel. This was followed by a race win for Button, who led from start to finish, with Barrichello second giving Brawn a 1–2 finish on their debut, which had not happened since Mercedes in the 1954 French Grand Prix.

Button won the rain-shortened  from pole and picked up the fastest lap.

Button ran most of the race in clean air and maintained the lead after the Toyotas pitted and fell down the order. This was the first time they were slower, with the fuel corrected qualifying times, in the season and was blamed on the lack of development on the car.

Brawn's fourth win saw them overtake Honda on the all-time wins list.

Button led Barrichello, who'd overtaken Kimi Räikkönen off the line, into the first corner with Button leading Barrichello, Räikkönen and Felipe Massa for the majority of the race. Button took Brawn's third 1–2 and his first hat trick of wins.

At the start, Barrichello's anti-stall cut in and he fell to the back of the grid; Button meanwhile, after pointing the car at Vettel got off cleanly and inherited the lead at turn 10 when Vettel ran wide. Button led the race calmly for the rest of the race with his teammate having many incidents before giving Brawn their first retirement after losing seventh gear.

The car couldn't heat up the tyres enough and both drivers struggled with balance issues. Button had his worst qualifying of the season in sixth with Barrichello achieving second. In the race neither of the drivers shone and both had rather quiet races to third and sixth with Button having a late surge.

The team qualified light as to get onto the front row and qualified behind Webber in second and third, respectively. Despite leading in the first stint, Barrichello finished sixth after a faulty fuel rig ruined his race. Button ran in the low points after getting stuck behind Kovalainen and managed to overtake Barrichello to finish fifth after the team inverted their pit-stop laps to lessen his disadvantage to contenders Webber and Vettel who finished first and second respectively.

The reason for Barrichello's underperformance was caused by his rear suspension failing resulting in a spring falling off and subsequently striking Ferrari's Felipe Massa on the helmet resulting in serious head injuries. Button too was affected by this as his car spent most of Q3 being checked to make sure the same components would not fail and ended up qualifying with much more fuel than planned. In the race neither driver showed much pace although when the temperature hit 40 °C Button was the fastest man on the track at that point. Button managed to repass Trulli through the final pit stops and finished seventh with his teammate in tenth closely behind Nakajima and Trulli.

Barrichello started third on the grid, behind the rejuvenated McLaren Mercedes cars of Lewis Hamilton and Heikki Kovalainen. While Barrichello thrived, Button started 5th on the grid, and finished the race in 7th after the retirement of Sebastian Vettel from 4th.

Barrichello started fourth, but again had a clutch issue at the start, but managed to work his way up to 7th, his car's engine bursting into flames as he entered the pits.

Both Brawns managed to make it past the heavily fuelled Kovalainen in the opening laps, and both kept up their pace to complete their final one-two of the season, Barrichello in first, Button in second.

Both drivers had reasonably successful races, eventually finishing seventh and eighth. This left Brawn just half a point from winning the Constructors' Championship. After the race, the race stewards announced they were investigating Nico Rosberg for excessive speed under safety car conditions. A typical 25-second penalty would have moved both Brawn drivers one place up and the Constructors' Championship would have been won, however it was announced later that Rosberg was in the clear and the race result would stand.

In , the final race of the season, they finished 3–4 with Button world champion and Barrichello 3rd in the championship. The team also won the 2010 Laureus World Sports Award for Team of the Year as a result of its success.

The team had a race win success rate of 47.05% (8 wins in 17 races), and by winning both titles in its only year of competition, the team is the first ever to achieve a 100% championship success rate.

Sale to Mercedes-Benz and legacy 
On 16 November 2009, it was officially announced that Daimler AG in partnership with Aabar Investments had purchased a 75.1% stake in Brawn GP (Daimler AG: 45.1%; Aabar: 30%). Reports suggest the partnership paid £110m for the 75.1%. The remaining 24.9% stake is Ross Brawn's in partnership with Nick Fry. The team used the Brawn GP base in Brackley for its operations and Brawn stayed on as team principal until the end of the  season.

BGP 001

The BGP 001 was originally designed with the intention of becoming the Honda RA109. In fact, owing to the poor performance of the Honda team in 2008, the team made a relatively early start in designing the 2009 car. However, following Honda's withdrawal, development of the car continued, in the hope that the team would be somehow rescued.

Eventually, the car was appropriated by the newly formed Brawn GP team, and modified to accommodate a Mercedes-Benz engine in place of the expected Honda engine. According to team CEO Nick Fry, the team would not have gone on to win the championship with the Honda engines, as according to him the Mercedes engine accounted for 50 percent of the team's upturn in performance. Jenson Button performed its shakedown – the car featuring white, fluorescent chartreuse yellow and black colours. The team gave the BGP 001 its first test at Circuit de Catalunya on 9 March 2009, topping the timesheets many times. With the testing moving to Circuito de Jerez, Brawn GP continued to set the pace, finishing the test leading two of the three tests. During an interview Brawn said there was more speed to come after he explained that '...The BGP 001 car is the result of 15 months of intensive development work and the team have been nothing less than fantastic in their commitment to producing two cars in time for the first race'. At the first race an official complaint was launched by four teams against the rear diffusers of the Williams FW31, Toyota TF109 and the Brawn BGP 001 on the grounds that they did not fall within the dimensions set out in the regulations, but after analysing the cars the race stewards reported that the cars were legal. This ruling was appealed and the appeal was heard after the second race of the season. However motorsport's governing body ruled that the car was legal. There was another complaint at Malaysia after which BMW Sauber joined the appeal after they were deemed legal, again. After the appeal the diffuser was deemed legal by the FIA. In Spain, the car received its first upgrades since Australia which were mainly to do with the different cooling requirements of the Mercedes engine and gave Brawn a 1–2, just as in Melbourne.

Button used a single Brawn BGP 001 during the 2009 season, making the chassis designated "BGP 001-02" one of the most successful F1 chassis of all time (Rubens Barrichello drove the chassis "BGP 001-01" until it was damaged in a qualifying accident at the Singapore Grand Prix, after which he used "BGP 001-03" for the rest of the season). Ross Brawn retained ownership of chassis BGP 001-02, which was subsequently restored to operational condition and to the championship winning livery (following a period of the car being displayed in silver Mercedes livery) and ran up the hill at the 2016 Festival of Speed at Goodwood, UK. Jenson Button took ownership of chassis BGP 001-01 as a condition of his contract with Brawn GP in the eventuality that he won the championship, after a protracted legal battle with the subsequent team owners (Mercedes). Chassis BGP 001-03 was retained by Mercedes following their acquisition of the team.

Sponsorship

The sponsors that were still with the Honda team at the end of the 2008 season, including Bridgestone, stayed on as sponsors for the start of the 2009 season.

On 26 March 2009, Brawn GP announced a partnership with British clothing manufacturer Henri Lloyd. Henri Lloyd, which became the "Official Supplier of Clothing and Footwear Technology" to Brawn GP under the deal, agreed to supply the team with clothing and footwear, with its brand appearing on the BGP 001. On 28 March 2009, mid-way through the Australian Grand Prix, Sir Richard Branson announced Virgin as a major sponsor for the team. On 17 April Brawn announced an agreement with MIG Investments, which would sport its logo on the front of the car. It was also confirmed on 19 April that Ray-Ban, a sunglasses manufacturer, would carry on sponsoring the team – its logo appears on the drivers' helmets. At the 2009 Bahrain Grand Prix the cars sported the Virgin Galactic logo instead of Virgin. Only for the Spanish Grand Prix, Sony Pictures joined the team with the cars featuring promotional imagery from the film Terminator Salvation. At the 2009 Monaco Grand Prix, Google co-founder Larry Page was rumoured to be in talks with Brawn to sponsor the team in 2010. Although a guest of McLaren-Mercedes, Page is believed to want the Google name to appear on a race-winning team. However they secured a one-race sponsorship with Wuppertal.
In addition, Monster Energy added its logo to Button's helmet from Silverstone onwards. However, Richard Branson indicated that Virgin was unlikely to continue its deal next season, citing cost as a hurdle. For the 2009 European Grand Prix, the cars sported the Virgin Active logo. 
For the 2009 Italian Grand Prix, the BGP 001 sported the Italian zipper company Raccagni logo and name on the side wings in front of the side-pods, as well as the Virgin Active logo once again.

For the 2009 Singapore Grand Prix, Brawn GP secured a sponsorship deal with Canon, and the cars also sported the Virgin Media logo.

For the 2009 Japanese Grand Prix, Brawn GP secured a single race sponsorship deal with Angfa Co. Ltd, maker of the medical shampoo Scalp-D, which has proved very popular in Japan since its launch in 2005. The Virgin Atlantic logo also appeared.

For the 2009 Brazilian Grand Prix, the event in which it won the Constructors' Championship, Brawn GP had deals with Banco do Brasil and Petrópolis brewery to display its colours and beer brand Itaipava and TNT energy drink on both cars. It also had a one-race partnership with Spanish insurance company Mapfre, while the Virgin Galactic logo reappeared.

For the 2009 Abu Dhabi Grand Prix, the team had a deal with Qatar Telecom, with the cars sporting the Virgin Galactic logo once more.

Complete Formula One results
(key)

 Half points awarded as less than 75% of race distance was completed

References

External links

Brawn GP profile at Formula1.com

 
Formula One entrants
Sport in Northamptonshire
Laureus World Sports Awards winners
Brackley
Auto racing teams established in 2009
Auto racing teams disestablished in 2009
Mercedes-Benz in Formula One
2009 establishments in England
2009 disestablishments in England
Formula One World Constructors' Champions